is a video game for the Game Boy Advance, developed and published by Marvelous Interactive. It was first released in Japan in April 2003, in North America in November 2003, and in Europe in March 2004. Many critics praised it as the best entry of the series, combining elements from the best-selling console entries and introducing many notable series staples. It was later released on the Virtual Console for the Wii U in June 2015.

The player is a farmer whose goal is to make a profit from the farm he runs by producing crops and raising livestock. Harvest Moon: Friends of Mineral Town is the first Game Boy Advance game of the Story of Seasons series, and is a remade version of Harvest Moon: Back to Nature. A 3D remake, titled Story of Seasons: Friends of Mineral Town, was released for the Nintendo Switch in Japan in October 2019 and worldwide by Xseed Games in July 2020, with the additional Microsoft Windows version. The remake was also released for Xbox One worldwide, and for PlayStation 4 in the west in October 2021. In Japan, the PlayStation 4 version was released in November 2021.

Story and gameplay

The player character in the game has no default name. In the opening sequences, the player is shown as a young boy living in the city, whose parents take him to see the country. During their trip, the player becomes lost, and finds himself on the farm of an old man in Mineral Town. The old man helps the player contact his parents, and offers to let him and his family stay for a few days, as he has no family of his own. The player's parents agree, and the player stays on the farm for a while. On the farm, the player plays with a girl who then becomes friends with him. After the player leaves Mineral Town, he continues to write letters to the old man. One day, when he has grown up, the letters from the old man suddenly stop. The player travels to Mineral Town, finding the farm neglected, and discovers the old man had died around half a year ago. The mayor of Mineral Town informs the player that in the farmer's will, he left the player the farm. The player decides to restore the farm, beginning the game.

The player starts with several tools, and must earn money by clearing the large field on the farm and planting crops, mining, or foraging. This money may be used to buy other things, such as livestock, and to expand the farm. The social aspect of Harvest Moon: Friends of Mineral Town is a large part of the game. There are many villagers to befriend, and six bachelorettes available to marry. Befriending villagers allows the player to learn recipes and discover villager's histories, and marriage allows the player to have a son. The game offers connectivity with the Nintendo GameCube game Harvest Moon: A Wonderful Life using a link cable between the Game Boy Advance and Nintendo GameCube.

The player begins with a dog that may be named. The dog starts as a puppy, but will be fully grown after two months. Shortly after meeting Barley for the first time, he will stop by the player's farm with a young horse and ask if they can take care of it. If the player accepts, Barley will return after a year, and may take the horse back if the player didn't show enough affection. There are three kinds of livestock: cows, chickens, and sheep. Cows produce milk (requires a milker to be gathered), chickens produce eggs, and sheep produce wool (requires shears to be gathered), which can be shipped off to be sold. As in every installment of the Story of Seasons series, shipping is added as a collection of crops, flowers, animal items and others.

Harvest Moon: More Friends of Mineral Town

 is the female version of Harvest Moon: Friends of Mineral Town, released in Japan in December 2003, and in North America in July 2005. In this game, the main character is a girl, and can marry one of eight bachelors. The player starts in the city, reading their newspaper. She sees an advertisement for a beautiful farm, and, excited by the prospect of rural life, decides to buy it. She visits the farm and finds out she was tricked, as the farm is run down and in need of maintenance. As she had already quit her job and sold her apartment, the player resolves to make the farm prosper the best she can, beginning the game. The base game remains almost unchanged, with the exception of several gameplay changes, improvements, and fixes.

Reception

IGN rated the game at 8.9, or "great", saying that it was "deceptively engrossing", and that the graphical presentation of the day to night cycles was very well done. GameRankings has an aggregate score of 82% from 31 reviews.
IGN rated Harvest Moon: More Friends of Mineral Town at 8.5. It was noted that it is essentially a repeat of Harvest Moon: Friends of Mineral Town, but that "it's still a great and highly recommended experience". GameRankings has an aggregate score of 79% from 14 reviews.

Remake
A 3D remake, Story of Seasons: Friends of Mineral Town, was released for the Nintendo Switch in Japan and Taiwan on October 17, 2019, in Europe on July 10, 2020, and in North America on July 14, 2020. A Microsoft Windows version was also released on July 14. The remake was later ported to Xbox One and PlayStation 4. Both versions were released on October 15 in Europe, and October 26, 2021 in North America. In Japan the game was first released for Xbox One on October 27, 2021, followed by PlayStation 4 on November 25, 2021.

Notes

References

External links
Natsume's FoMT webpage, archived from March 31, 2010.

2003 video games
Game Boy Advance games
Nintendo Switch games
PlayStation 4 games
Story of Seasons games
Video games developed in Japan
Video games with alternative versions
Virtual Console games
Virtual Console games for Wii U
Windows games
Xbox One games
Games with GameCube-GBA connectivity
Single-player video games